Michael Allen Wise (June 5, 1964 – August 21, 1992) was a professional American football defensive end in the National Football League. He played five seasons for the Los Angeles Raiders (1986–1990) and the Cleveland Browns (1991). He was drafted in 1986 by the Raiders and appeared on the cover of a 1990 issue of Sports Illustrated.  He wore jersey #90.

Wise was born in Greenbrae, California. He committed suicide at his home in Davis in 1992.

References

1964 births
1992 deaths
People from Greenbrae, California
Players of American football from California
Sportspeople from the San Francisco Bay Area
American football defensive ends
UC Davis Aggies football players
Los Angeles Raiders players
Cleveland Browns players
Suicides by firearm in California
People from Davis, California
1992 suicides